Las Vegas–Clark County Library District (LVCCLD) Is an independent government agency. Operations are overseen by a ten-member Board of Trustees, five appointed by the Clark County Commission and five appointed by the Las Vegas City Council. LVCCLD is headquartered at the Windmill Library Service Center at 7060 W. Windmill Ln., Las Vegas, NV 

The district services Clark County, including Las Vegas; the system does not operate branches in Henderson and North Las Vegas. However, the North Las Vegas Library District and Boulder City Library have contracts with LVCCLD for automation services. This enables the North Las Vegas Library District's and Boulder City's items to appear in the online catalog of LVCCLD.

Services
In addition to loaning traditional materials to the public, LVCCLD also provides:
Free Wi-Fi
Public computers
Printing, copying and faxing services
Curbside pickup
Searchable databases
Online resources (eBooks, audiobooks, magazines, movies & TV, music, online courses, and more)
Interlibrary Loans (ILL) with libraries across the country
Various events and exhibits throughout the year
Homework help centers
Homebound services
Storytimes
Toy lending library
iPad and Wi-Fi hotspot lending
Makerspaces
and more...

Branches
The system has 13 urban branches and 11 outlying branches.

Centennial Hills Library 

Located at 6711 N Buffalo Dr., Las Vegas, NV 89131, adjacent to the Centennial Hills Park
LEED certified gold building, constructed to reduce negative environmental impacts and improve occupant health and well-being
Public computers
Homework help center
Meeting room with 60-seat capacity
Study rooms
Used bookstore
Café area

Clark County Library 
Located at 1401 E Flamingo Rd, Las Vegas, NV 89119
Originally opened in 1971, remodeled in 1986 and again in 1994 to a design by noted architect Michael Graves.
400-seat community theater for performing arts events and 80-seat Paul C. Blau Theatre
Study rooms
Best Buy Teen Tech Center
Houses the Southern Nevada Nonprofit Information Center
Used bookstore
Public computers
Adult learning program office

Enterprise Library 

Located at 8310 S Las Vegas Blvd, Las Vegas, NV 89123, on the world famous Las Vegas Strip
Study rooms
Meeting room
Public computers
COX Teen STEAM LAB
Used bookstore

East Las Vegas Library 
Located at 2851 E Bonanza Rd, Las Vegas, NV 89101
Built From Scratch Tech Lab (music production and video editing workstations, along with industry-standard DJ equipment and isolated sound booth for recording)
Robot LAB
Homework help center with free tutoring
Toy lending library
Outdoor play area
Demonstration kitchen
Multipurpose room is a large space available to enjoy educational lectures, personal and cultural enrichment, and social events. The public can rent this room for meetings, live performances, private parties, and any special occasion
Career services offered at the One-Stop Career Center
Public computers
Café
Adult learning program office

Meadows Library 
The branch is an outreach branch in the Chester A. Stupak Community Center.

Rainbow Library 
Located at3150 N Buffalo Dr., Las Vegas, NV 89128
Public computer
Meeting room
Study rooms

Sahara West Library 
Located at 9600 W Sahara Ave, Las Vegas, NV 89117
Library Foundation used bookstore
160-seat multipurpose room
60-seat glass room
45-seat board room
Public computers
Study rooms
3D printer for teens
Art gallery

Spring Valley Library 

 Located at 4280 S Jones Blvd, Las Vegas, NV 89103
 Art Gallery
 Public computers
 50 person capacity conference room

Summerlin Library 

 Located at 1771 Inner Circle Dr., Las Vegas, NV 89134
 Art gallery
 Used bookstore
 Public computers
 284-seat theater
 40-seat conference room
 Study rooms

Sunrise Library 
Located at 5400 E Harris Ave, Las Vegas, NV 89110
 Established in 1987
 Study rooms
 Used bookstore
 Teen Zone
 Public computers

West Charleston Library 

 Located at 6301 W Charleston Blvd, Las Vegas, NV 89146
 Art gallery
 Used bookstore
 Study rooms
 276-seat lecture hall
 Public Computers

West Las Vegas Library 

 Located at 951 W Lake Mead Blvd, Las Vegas, NV 89106
 298-seat theatre
 Homework help center
 Public Computers
 Meeting room
Study rooms
 Art gallery
 3D Printer

Whitney Library 

 Located at 5175 E Tropicana Ave, Las Vegas, NV 89122
 Art gallery
 520-square-foot conference room
 Used bookstore
Meeting room
Study rooms
Public computer

Windmill Library 

 Located at 7060 W Windmill Ln, Las Vegas, NV 89113
 Opened in 2011
Adjacent Service Center houses the Library District's administrative offices, support functions and processing center
Public computers
Passport services
Study rooms
Meeting room

Outlying branches

Blue Diamond Library (Unincorporated area) 
The library opened in 1970; it consisted of a trailer purchased with a Federal Grant. In 1989 a resident constructed a  building that became the permanent library. As of 2009 it has over 7,000 volumes.

Bunkerville Library (Unincorporated area) 
The library opened in 1968 in a portion of a former school gymnasium. As of 2009 it occupies a building shared with the Parks and Recreation Department.

Goodsprings Library (Unincorporated area 
The library opened in 1968 in a former mining house owned by the librarian's parents. In 1970 it moved into a trailer which it occupies as of 2009.

Indian Springs Library (Unincorporated area 
The  library occupies an area shared with the Senior Center and has 7,500 volumes.

Laughlin Library (Unincorporated area) 
 In 1987 the library began in a storefront. A permanent branch opened in 1994. The library is the largest of the rural branches.

Mesquite Library (Mesquite) 
 The branch opened in 1968 and, as of 2009, houses 28,000 volumes.

Moapa Town Library (Unincorporated area) 
 The  library serves the Moapa Town community.

Moapa Valley Library (Unincorporated area) 
 The library first opened in 1967 and received a new facility in 1987. As of 2009 it has 22,500 volumes.

Mount Charleston Library (Unincorporated area) 
 The library has a  facility.

Sandy Valley Library (Unincorporated area) 
 In 1984 the library began in the closet of a former community center. As of 2009 it shares a  building with a community center and has 6,200 volumes.

Searchlight Library (Unincorporated area) 
The library opened in 1969. In 1984 the library moved into a building constructed with Federal Block Grant money. The library, which shares the building with the Health Clinic and the Searchlight Museum, has more than 7,000 articles.

References

External links 
 

Government of Clark County, Nevada
Library districts
Public libraries in Nevada
Education in Clark County, Nevada